Chrysoprasis auriventris is a species of beetle in the family Cerambycidae. It was described by Redtenbacher in 1868.

References

Chrysoprasis
Beetles described in 1868